Hawijch Elders is a Dutch violinist born on 31 October 1998.

Biography 
Elders started violin lessons at the age of six at Mea Fontijn, and from 2011-2016 she received violin lessons and chamber music lessons from Benzion Shamir. She has been following her violin training with Ilya Grubert at the Conservatorium van Amsterdam since 2016, where she completed the Bachelor of Music (2020) and Master of Music (2022) degree programmes with highest distinction. Since September 2022, she is Artist in Residence at the Queen Elisabeth Music Chapel, where she studies with Augustin Dumay.

She received many prizes and awards at national and international violin competitions. In 2018, Hawijch Elders wins four prizes at the prestigious international competition 'Rodolfo Lipizer' in Italy. Beside the second prize she was also awarded for three special prizes: the prize for best performance of a Sivori etude, the prize for most talented young violinist and the prize for best performance of a 20th century sonata. During 2018, at the Netherlands violin competition "Oskar Back", Hawijch Elders won the second prize and the Audience Award. In 2021, she was awarded the second prize at the Odesa International Violin Competition and the first prize at the 5th Leonid Kogan International Competition.

Hawijch Elders often performs in the Netherlands and abroad. As a soloist she played with the Real Filharmonía de Galicia, Domestica Rotterdam, the Amsterdam Symphony Orchestra, the Nieuwe Philharmonie Utrecht, the Netherlands Philharmonic Orchestra, the Residentie Orchestra, Amadeus Chamber Orchestra of Polish Radio, Odessa Philharmonic Orchestra and the Orquestra Clássica da Madeira. She has worked in chamber music concerts with Valeriy Sokolov, Quirine Viersen and Maria Milstein.

Instrument 
Hawijch Elders plays a Gennaro Gagliano violin (Naples ca.1755) and a Jean-Pierre Persoit bow on loan from the Nationaal Muziekinstrumenten Fonds. The violin belongs to the 'collection Willem G. Vogelaar' and the bow belongs to the 'collection Tettelaar'.

Awards 

 2022 – XII International Jean Sibelius Violin Competition, Semi-Finalist and Sibelius family prize
 2021/2022 – Dutch Classical Talent, Laureate
 2021 – Leonid Kogan International Competition for Young Violinists, 1st Prize
 2021 – II Odesa International Violin Competition, 2nd Prize
 2019 – Kersjes-vioolbeurs (Kersjes van de Groenekan Award)
 2019 – 3rd Oleh Krysa International Violin Competition, Laureate
 2018 – 37th International Violin Competition ‘Premio Rodolfo Lipizer’, 2nd Prize
 2018 – Netherlands Violin Competition "Oskar Back", 2nd Prize and Audience Prize
 2014 – Classic Young Master Award 2014
 2013 – Prinses Christina Concours - National Finals, 2nd Prize and Audience Prize
 2010 – Iordens Viooldagen, 1st Prize

References

External links 

 

1998 births
Living people
Musicians from Grenoble
Women classical violinists
Dutch classical violinists
21st-century women musicians
21st-century classical violinists